"Betty" (stylized in all lowercase) is a song by American singer-songwriter Taylor Swift, taken from her eighth studio album, Folklore (2020). It was written by Swift and Joe Alwyn (under the pseudonym William Bowery), who produced the track with Aaron Dessner and Jack Antonoff. MCA Nashville and Republic Records released the song to US country radio on August 17, 2020. "Betty" is an Americana-inspired song combining country, folk rock, and guitar pop. Its production consists of a harmonica, a pedal steel, guitars, and a key change after the bridge.

The lyrics are about a relationship between two fictitious characters named James and Betty. Some media publications initially interpreted the song in a queer context due to the lyrics not mentioning James's gender, but Swift stated that James is a 17-year-old boy. Narrated from his perspective, "Betty" is about his apology to Betty after having cheated on her. They are two of the three characters involved in a love triangle depicted in three Folklore tracks, the other two being "Cardigan" (from Betty's perspective) and "August" (from the remaining unnamed character's perspective).

Music critics viewed "Betty" as a throwback to Swift's early country-music songs. Many praised its engaging storytelling and commended how her songwriting matured over the course of her career. "Betty" peaked at number six on Hot Country Songs and number 42 on the Billboard Hot 100. It peaked within the top 40 on singles charts in Australia, Canada, and Singapore. The single was certified gold by Music Canada (MC) and silver by the British Phonographic Industry (BPI). Swift performed "Betty" live at the 55th Academy of Country Music Awards on September 16, 2020. The performance was recorded, and released on digital music platforms two days later. The song was included on the set list of the Eras Tour in 2023.

Background and release 

American singer-songwriter Taylor Swift conceived her eighth studio album, Folklore, while quarantining amidst the COVID-19 pandemic, with producers Jack Antonoff and Aaron Dessner of the National. "Betty" is the only song on Folklore produced by both Antonoff and Dessner. For the song's sound, Swift used Bob Dylan's albums The Freewheelin' Bob Dylan (1963) and John Wesley Harding (1967) as reference points. The song features a co-writing credit from Swift's partner Joe Alwyn, whom was initially credited under the pseudonym William Bowery. She stated that, one day, she heard Alwyn "singing the entire, fully formed chorus...from another room" and asked if they could write a song together while in quarantine, which eventually became "Betty". Swift cited Patty Griffin's "Top of the World" (2004) as her inspiration to write from a male perspective.

Antonoff, Dessner, alongside engineers Jonathan Low and Laura Sisk, recorded "Betty" at Kitty Committee Studio (Swift's home studio in Los Angeles) and Long Pond Studio (Dessner's studio in Hudson Valley, New York). The instruments were recorded at Hook & Fade Studios in East Williamsburg, New York, Pleasure Hill Recording in Portland, Maine, and Rough Customer Studio in Brooklyn. Serban Ghenea mixed the track at MixStar Studios in Virginia Beach, Virginia. Swift surprise-released Folklore on July 24, 2020. In the primer that preceded the release, Swift teased imageries of various tracks, with "Betty" being about "a seventeen-year-old standing on a porch, learning to apologize". On August 17, 2020, Republic Records and MCA Nashville released the track to US country radio as a single.

Composition and lyrics

"Betty" runs for four minutes and 54 seconds. An Americana-influenced song, it features a production that critics described as reminiscent of Swift's early country-music albums. They pointed to the use of guitars, a pedal steel, and an interlacing harmonica. Hannah Mylrea of NME commented the track combines country with folk rock. Other reviewers described the genre as guitar pop, and 1990s alternative pop. The song incorporates a key change after the bridge. Critics likened "Betty" to the songs of other musicians. Vulture's Justin Curto said it harkens back to the guitar-pop sound of alternative rock band Sixpence None the Richer in the 1990s, whereas Rob Sheffield of Rolling Stone compared the harmonica solo to that in Bruce Springsteen's 1975 song "Thunder Road".

As with other Folklore tracks, "Betty" features vivid storytelling. It is one of the three tracks that depict a fictitious "teenage love triangle", the other two being "Cardigan" and "August". They narrate the storyline from the perspectives of each of the characters involved, at different times in their lives. "Betty" is narrated from the perspective of James, who cheated on the titular character Betty, as he involves himself in a "summer fling" with the unnamed female narrator of "August". Therefore, James "show[s] up" at Betty's party to reconcile with her. He apologizes about his past mistakes but does not fully own up to them, citing his disdain of crowds and Betty's "wandering eye" as excuses. Swift explained that James "has lost the love of his life basically and doesn't understand how to get it back".

The lyrical structure of "Betty" is characterized by a dramatic shift from the conditional ("If I just showed up at your party/Would you have me?") to the present ("I showed up at your party/Will you have me?"). Inez is an additional character named in the song, who is portrayed as a gossiping neighbor. James confesses that, even though Betty does not usually believe Inez because her gossips are mostly false, Inez is right this time about him. The characters—James, Betty, Inez—are named after the daughters of actors Ryan Reynolds and Blake Lively. References to a porch and a cardigan at the end of "Betty" echo the imagery in "Cardigan". Although Swift explicitly stated that James is a 17-year-old boy, due to the lack of mention of James's gender anywhere in the album, some audience interpreted "Betty" in a queer context. When Dessner was asked about the song's potential queerness, he replied: "I can't speak to what it's about. I have my own ideas. I also know where Taylor's heart is, and I think that's great anytime a song takes on greater meaning for anyone."

Critical reception 
Music critics gave "Betty" mostly positive reviews. Many complimented Swift's songwriting as intricate and vivid and noted how it matured since her early teenage works. For Variety's Chris Willman and Esquire's Dave Holmes, the song exemplifies Folklore's fictional narratives departing from Swift's previously known autobiographical songwriting; the latter deemed it the album's centerpiece. The Atlantic critic Spencer Kornhaber lauded how the "suspenseful" storytelling made him "stand up and put [his] hands on [his] head while waiting for it to end". Finn McRedmond of The Irish Times praised the narrative of "Betty" as captivating as a feature film and wrote that by the end of the track, "only then do you realise how catchy the melody is". Rob Harvilla of The Ringer thought "Betty" "will remind you how sensitive and sly a songwriter she is and has always been".

Ellen Johnson of Paste named the track as one of the best country songs of 2020, stating that it proves Swift's empathy "truly knows no bounds", being written from the point of view of a "regretful" teenage boy. In The New York Times's individual critics' lists of the best 2020 songs, "Betty" was included on such lists by Jon Caramanica and Lindsay Zoladz. The Tampa Bay Times featured the track on their list of the 30 best songs of 2020. At the 2021 BMI London Awards, "Betty" won an award for "Most Performed Songs of the Year", marking Alwyn's first BMI win.

Commercial performance
After Folklore was released, on the Billboard charts dated August 8, 2020, "Betty" debuted at number six on Hot Country Songs and number 42 on the Billboard Hot 100. It is Swift's 22nd to reach the top ten on Hot Country Songs and marked the highest debut for a woman since Bebe Rexha's "Meant to Be" (2017). The song debuted at number 60 on the Country Airplay chart, marking Swift's 36th entry. On country-music charts, "Betty" opened at number one on Country Streaming Songs and number 15 on Country Digital Song Sales. After its country-radio single release on August 17, 2020, it was the most added track of the week on Mediabase-monitored country radio stations.

Elsewhere, "Betty" peaked on singles charts of Australia (22), Canada (32), Singapore (22), Scotland (58), and Ireland (88). In the United Kingdom, "Betty" peaked at number 92 on the UK Singles Downloads Chart and was certified silver by the British Phonographic Industry. The single was additionally certified gold by Music Canada (MC). Following the inauguration of the Billboard Global 200 chart, "Betty" appeared on the chart at number 180, dated September 19, 2020.

Live acoustic version
Swift performed "Betty" live at the 55th Academy of Country Music Awards at the Grand Ole Opry House on September 16, 2020, marking Swift's first performance at a country-music show in seven years. Seated in front of a glowing stage light, she performed the clean version on a black Gibson acoustic guitar and was accompanied by one harmonica player. She wore a burgundy sequined turtleneck and khaki pants. The live version was released onto music streaming and digital platforms on September 18, 2020. Swift auctioned off the Gibson guitar, which she autographed, at Christie's auction house, as part of Academy of Country Music's COVID-19 relief fund.

Credits and personnel
Credits are adapted from Tidal.

 Taylor Swift – vocals, songwriter, producer
 Joe Alwyn – songwriter, producer
 Aaron Dessner – producer, recording engineer, percussion, piano, bass, high string guitar, electric guitar
 Jack Antonoff – producer, recording engineer, drums, percussion, bass, electric guitar, acoustic guitar, organ, Mellotron
 Josh Kaufman – recording engineer, harmonica, electric guitar, lap steel
 Laura Sisk – recording engineer
 Jonathan Low – recording engineer
 Serban Ghenea – mixer
 John Hanes – engineer
 John Rooney – assistant engineer
 Randy Merrill – mastering engineer
 Mikey Freedom Hart – Mellotron, pedal steel, Wurlitzer, harpsichord, vibraphone, electric guitar
 Evan Smith – saxophones, clarinet

Charts

Weekly charts

Year-end charts

Certifications

Release history

Notes

References

External links
 

2020 singles
2020 songs
American folk rock songs
American country music songs
Taylor Swift songs
Songs written by Taylor Swift
Songs written by Joe Alwyn
Song recordings produced by Taylor Swift
Song recordings produced by Jack Antonoff
Song recordings produced by Aaron Dessner
Song recordings produced by Joe Alwyn
Republic Records singles
Songs about infidelity
Songs about teenagers